Santa Ana is a locality located within the municipality of Alcañices, province of Zamora, Castile and León, Spain. According to the 2014 census (INE) the locality has a population of 20 inhabitants.

See also
List of municipalities in Zamora

References

Municipalities of the Province of Zamora